The Men's 100 Freestyle at the 10th FINA World Swimming Championships (25m) was swum 18 – 19 December in Dubai, United Arab Emirates. On 18 December 125 individuals swam in the Preliminary heats in the morning, with the top-16 advancing onto Semifinals that evening. The top-8 from Semifinals then advanced to the final the next evening.

Records
At the start of the event, the existing World (WR) and Championship records (CR) were as follows.

The following records were established during the competition:

Results

Heats

 Fraser scratched the semifinals, so Dunford (17th) advanced to the semifinals in his place.

Semifinals

Final

References

Freestyle 0100 metre, men's
World Short Course Swimming Championships